The Kemmerer Main Post Office in Kemmerer, Wyoming was built in 1934 as part of a facilities improvement program by the United States Post Office Department.  The post office in Kemmerer was nominated to the National Register of Historic Places as part of a thematic study comprising twelve Wyoming post offices built to standardized USPO plans in the early twentieth century.

References

External links
 at the National Park Service's NRHP database
Kemmerer Main Post Office at the Wyoming State Historic Preservation Office

Neoclassical architecture in Wyoming
Government buildings completed in 1934
Buildings and structures in Lincoln County, Wyoming
Kemmerer
Post office buildings on the National Register of Historic Places in Wyoming
National Register of Historic Places in Lincoln County, Wyoming
Kemmerer, Wyoming
1934 establishments in Wyoming